Dexiosoma caninum is a European species of fly in the family Tachinidae. In the United Kingdom, the species can most commonly be found during the summer in the south of England.

References

Tachininae
Diptera of Europe
Insects described in 1781
Taxa named by Johan Christian Fabricius